Stéphane Roy (born July 2, 1959) is a Canadian electroacoustic music composer and writer on music. An associate composer of the Canadian Music Centre, his works have received awards from international competitions in Canada, the USA, and Europe. He currently teaches electroacoustic techniques and auditory perception at the Université de Montréal and is also a faculty member at the Conservatoire de musique du Québec à Montréal. He is the current vice-president of the Canadian Electroacoustic Community  He lives in Greenfield Park, Quebec, Canada.

Born in Saint-Jean-sur-Richelieu, Roy earned both a doctorate degree in electroacoustic composition and a PhD in musicology from the Université de Montréal. He is the author of L'analyse des musiques électroacoustiques: Modèles et propositions (published 2003, Paris), a book on electroacoustic music analysis.

Recordings
 Migrations (empreintes DIGITALes, IMED 0373, 2003)
 Kaleidos (empreintes DIGITALes, IMED 9630, 1996)

List of works
 Appartenances (2003)
 La basilique fantôme (1998, 2000), guitar and tape
 Crystal Music (1994)
 Inaccessible azur (1997), instrumental quartet and tape
 Masques et parades (2000–2003)
 Mimetismo (1992), guitar, and tape
 Ondes / Arborescences (1987)
 Paysages intérieurs (1988)
 Récit pour cordes (1998)
 Résonances d'arabesques (1990)
 Trois petites histoires concrètes (1998)
 Une âme nue glisse à l'eau vive (2005), film: Denis Chabot / 2005 / 35 mm / colour / animation / 15 min 55 s / no dialogue

References

1959 births
Canadian composers
Canadian male composers
Academic staff of the Conservatoire de musique du Québec à Montréal
Electroacoustic music composers
French Quebecers
Living people
People from Longueuil
People from Saint-Jean-sur-Richelieu
Université de Montréal alumni
Academic staff of the Université de Montréal